Marcos Fabían Cangá Casierra (born December 10, 1988) and nicknamed "the Train" is an Ecuadorian defender currently playing for 9 de Octubre F.C. on loan from Guayaquil City of the Ecuadorian first division league.

Cangá featured regularly for Delfín S.C. as the club gained successive promotions to Ecuadorian Serie B and Ecuadorian Serie A.

Honours
Delfín
Ecuadorian Serie B: 2015

References

External links
 

1988 births
Living people
Ecuadorian footballers
C.D. El Nacional footballers
Delfín S.C. footballers
C.S.D. Independiente del Valle footballers
Guayaquil City F.C. footballers
Ecuadorian Serie A players
Ecuadorian Serie B players
Association football defenders